is a passenger railway station in located in the city of Iga,  Mie Prefecture, Japan, operated by the private railway operator Iga Railway.

Lines
Nishi-Ōte Station is served by the Iga Line, and is located 3.3 rail kilometers from the starting point of the line at Iga-Ueno Station.

Station layout
The station consists of a single side platform serving bidirectional traffic. The station is unattended.

Platform

Adjacent stations

History
Nishi-Ōte Station was opened on August 8, 1916. Through a series of mergers, the Iga Line became part of the Kintetsu network by June 1, 1944, but was spun out as an independent company in October 2007. Freight operations were discontinued from October 1973 and the station has been unattended since March 15, 2000.

Passenger statistics
In fiscal 2019, the station was used by an average of 107 passengers daily (boarding passengers only).

Surrounding area
Mie Prefectural Ueno High School
Iga City Suko Junior High School
Asahi Inari Taisha Shrine

See also
List of railway stations in Japan

References

External links

  

Railway stations in Japan opened in 1916
Railway stations in Mie Prefecture
Iga, Mie